Thomas Joseph Williams, more commonly known as Tom Williams, (12 May 1923 – 2 September 1942) was a volunteer in C Company, 2nd Battalion of the Belfast Brigade in the Irish Republican Army from the Bombay Street area of Belfast, Northern Ireland. He was hanged in the Crumlin Road Gaol for his involvement in the killing of Royal Ulster Constabulary (RUC) police officer, Patrick Murphy during the Northern Campaign.

Early years

Williams was born at 6 Amcomri Street in the Beechmount area of Belfast in 1923. He was the third child in a family of six. His brother Richard was the eldest, his sister Mary died of meningitis at the age of three. Williams' mother Mary died, at the age of 29, after giving birth to his sister Sheila, who also died shortly after.

After the death of his mother, Williams and his brother then went to live with their grandmother at 46 Bombay Street in the Clonard area of Belfast. Williams family had had to leave the small Catholic enclave in the Shore Road area of Belfast before moving to Beechmount, after their house was attacked and burnt.

According to Williams's biographer, Jim McVeigh:

Williams's uncle Terry Williams was jailed for his part in defending the Shore Road enclave during this period.

As a child, Williams suffered from asthma and as a result was often very ill. He attended St Gall's Primary School but left at an early age to obtain work, which at the time was difficult due to discrimination. His work therefore consisted of labouring and as a delivery boy.

Na Fianna Éireann

As soon as Williams was old enough, he joined Na Fianna Éireann, the republican Scout Organisation founded by Countess Markievicz in 1909, becoming a member of the Con Colbert slua in the Clonard area. Alfie Hannaway, a friend of Williams was his OC in Na Fianna, and assigned Williams to the rank of Quartermaster for the company.
Williams took his role in Na Fianna very seriously and all who came to know him were struck by his dedication and maturity, even at this early age.

Most of his activities in Na Fianna took place in a small hall in Kane Street, just off Bombay Street. There they spent their time drilling, attending lectures in history, and sometimes scouted for the Irish Republican Army (IRA). With their own money the boys were able to equip the hall with a boxing ring, PT equipment and some tables and chairs.

IRA activity
At the age of 17, Williams was old enough to become a volunteer and joined C Company of the IRA in the Clonard area where he lived. C Company's area of operations ran the extent of the lower Springfield Road, along the Falls Road from Beechmount to Conway Street, and surrounding the streets in between. Due to his "dedication and his remarkable ability" Williams was appointed to the role of Adjutant of C Company.

At Easter 1942 the government of Northern Ireland had banned all parades to commemorate the anniversary of the Easter Rising. An IRA unit of six men and two women staged a diversionary action against the RUC to allow three parades to take place in West Belfast, but in this clash an RUC officer was killed and the six IRA men were captured. The RUC officer, Constable Patrick Murphy, a father of nine children, from the Falls Road, was one of a minority of Catholics serving in the RUC.

There has been some debate over the years about who actually fired the fatal shot.  The six IRA members were convicted and sentenced to death for murder under the law of common purpose.  Five, Henry Cordner (19); William James Perry (21); Sean Terence Oliver (21); Patrick Simpson (18); and Joe Cahill (21) (who went on to become a senior figure in the IRA) had their sentences commuted.  Williams, who acknowledged that he was the leader of the IRA unit involved, and took full responsibility for the actions of his men, did not.

Execution

Williams was hanged in Crumlin Road Gaol Belfast at 08:00 on Wednesday 2 September 1942. The executioner was the official English hangman Thomas Pierrepoint, assisted by his nephew Albert Pierrepoint. Afterwards Williams' body was interred in unhallowed ground in an unmarked grave within the grounds of the prison. His remains were only released in January 2000 after the closure of the prison in 1996 and a lengthy campaign by the National Graves Association, Belfast.

Before Williams was executed he inscribed some messages on the backs of some playing cards. On one he wrote "To ever who receives this to pray for me always & pray for the cause for which I am dying. God Save Ireland…."
Father Alexis who witnessed the execution spoke after to his friends in the prison chapel. "I met the bravest of the brave this morning", he said, "Tom Williams walked to that scaffold without a tremor in his body. The only people who were shaking were us and the hangman". Father Alexis concluded by saying to the remaining prisoners, "I’ve one other thing to say to you. Don’t pray for Tom Williams, pray to him, for at this moment Tom is a saint in heaven."
  
His funeral held on 19 January 2000 was attended by thousands, with Williams buried at Milltown Cemetery. Joe Cahill, Tom's cell mate, and John Oliver, sentenced to death with Tom but later reprieved, as well as Madge McConville, who had been arrested with Tom, Greta McGlone, Billy McKee, Eddie Keenan and perhaps least known, Nell Morgan, Tom's girlfriend at the time of his death, were all present. Six senior Sinn Féin members including Gerry Adams were also present in St Paul's Church on the Lower Falls Road for the Mass. Tom's boyhood friend and the man who introduced him to the Republican Movement, Alfie Hannaway, was unable to attend the funeral due to ill health. Tom's funeral Mass was celebrated by Rev Fr Paddy O'Donnell, C.Ss.R., a Redemptorist Priest from Clonard Monastery.

In Irish republican culture
He is remembered in a ballad Tom Williams. Various recordings have been made, most notably by the Flying Column, and by Éire Óg who preamble their version with the story of the campaign to release his body. The now disbanded, Volunteer Tom Williams Republican Flute Band from Glasgow, Scotland was named in his memory as was the Tom Williams Camogie Club in Belfast

References 

1923 births
1942 deaths
Irish Republican Army (1922–1969) members
Executed Irish people
Irish people convicted of murdering police officers
People executed by Northern Ireland
People convicted of murder by Northern Ireland
People executed for murdering police officers
Paramilitaries from Belfast
1942 in Northern Ireland
1942 murders in the United Kingdom
1940s murders in Northern Ireland